Magnus Maximus (c.335-388) was a usurper of the Western Roman Empire.

Maxen may also mean:

 Battle of Maxen (1759), a battle fought at the village of Maxen (modern day Müglitztal, Germany)
 Maxen Kapo (born 2001), French footballer

See also